Céline Abgottspon (born 24 November 1995) is a Swiss ice hockey player for HC Lugano and the Swiss national team.

She participated at the 2015 IIHF Women's World Championship.

References

External links

1995 births
Living people
Swiss women's ice hockey defencemen
Göteborg HC players